Lung Hang Estate is a public housing estate in Tai Wai, New Territories, Hong Kong. It is located between Hin Keng Estate and Sun Chui Estate, and consists of 6 residential blocks completed in 1983 and 1985 respectively.

King Tin Court is a Home Ownership Scheme court in Tai Wai, near Lung Hang Estate. It consists of six residential buildings built in 1983.

Houses

Lung Hang Estate

King Tin Court

Demographics
According to the 2016 by-census, Lung Hang Estate had a population of 13,306 while King Tin Court had a population of 3,559. Altogether the population amounts to 16,865.

Politics
For the 2019 District Council election, the estate fell within two constituencies. Lung Hang Estate is located in the Tin Sum constituency, which was formerly represented by Tsang Kit until July 2021, while King Tin Court falls within the Chui Tin constituency, which was formerly represented by Rick Hui Yui-yu until July 2021.

See also

Public housing estates in Tai Wai

References

Residential buildings completed in 1983
Residential buildings completed in 1985
Tai Wai
Public housing estates in Hong Kong